Vigeois is a commune in the Corrèze department in central France. Vigeois station has rail connections to Brive-la-Gaillarde, Uzerche and Limoges.

Population

Notable residents
Henri Cueco, painter.

See also
Communes of the Corrèze department

References

Communes of Corrèze